There have been three baronetcies created for persons with the surname Osborne, two in the baronetage of England and one in the baronetage of Ireland. Two creations are extant.

The Osborne baronetcy, of Kiveton in the County of York, was created in the Baronetage of England on 13 July 1620. For more information on this creation, see the Duke of Leeds.

The Osborne, later Osborn baronetcy, of Chicksands in the County of Bedford, was created in the Baronetage of England on 11 February 1662. For more information on this creation, see Osborn baronets.

The Osborne baronetcy, of Ballentaylor and Ballylemon in County Waterford, was created in the Baronetage of Ireland on 15 October 1629 for Richard Osborne. The second and seventh baronets represented County Waterford in the Irish House of Commons, the eighth Baronet represented Carysfort while the eleventh baronet sat in Parliament for Carysfort and Enniskillen. The eleventh baronet voted against the Act of Union in 1799 in order to retain Ireland's independence from Great Britain and voted against it again in 1800 before the legislation was finally enacted. The former British Chancellor of the Exchequer, George Osborne, is heir apparent to his family's Irish baronetcy; the former family seat was Newtown Anner House, County Tipperary.

Osborne baronets, of Kiveton (1620)
See Duke of Leeds

Osborne, later Osborn baronets, of Chicksands (1662)
See Osborn baronets

Osborne baronets, of Ballintaylor and Ballylemon (1629)

Sir Richard Osborne, 1st Baronet (died 1667)
Sir Richard Osborne, 2nd Baronet (died 1685)
Sir John Osborne, 3rd Baronet (died April 1713)
Sir Richard Osborne, 4th Baronet (died October 1713)
Sir Thomas Osborne, 5th Baronet (died 1715)
Sir Nicholas Osborne, 6th Baronet (died 1719)
Sir John Osborne, 7th Baronet (died 1743)
Sir William Osborne, 8th Baronet (died 1783)
Sir Thomas Osborne, 9th Baronet (1757–1821)
Sir William Osborne, 10th Baronet (1817–1824)
Sir Henry Osborne, 11th Baronet (died 1837)
Sir Daniel Toler Osborne, 12th Baronet (1783–1853)
Sir William Osborne, 13th Baronet (1805–1875)
Sir Charles Stanley Osborne, 14th Baronet (1825–1879)
Sir Francis Osborne, 15th Baronet (1856–1948)
Sir George Francis Osborne, 16th Baronet (1894–1960)
Sir Peter George Osborne, 17th Baronet (born 1943)

The heir apparent is the present holder's eldest son George Osborne, who is the former chancellor of the exchequer. The heir-in-line is George Osborne's only legitimate son, Luke Benedict Osborne (born 2001).

  Sir Richard Osborne of Ballintaylor and Ballylemon, 1st Baronet (d. b. 1667)
  Sir Richard Osborne, 2nd Baronet (d. 1685)
  Sir John Osborne, 3rd Baronet (d. 1713)
  Sir Richard Osborne, 4th Baronet (1713)
 Nicholas Osborne (d. 1695/6)
  Sir Thomas Osborne, 5th Baronet (d. 1715)
 Nicholas Osborne (d. 1714)
  Sir John Osborne, 7th Baronet (d. 1743)
  Rt. Hon. Sir William Osborne, 8th Baronet (d. 1783)
  Sir Thomas Osborne, 9th Baronet (1757—1821)
  Sir William Osborne, 10th Baronet (1817—1824)
  Sir Henry Osborne, 11th Baronet (a. 1758—1837)
  Sir Daniel Toler Osborne, 12th Baronet (1783—1853)
  Sir William Osborne, 13th Baronet (1805—1875)
  Sir Charles Stanley Osborne, 14th Baronet (1825—1879)
 Charles Osborne (1816—1871)
  Sir Francis Osborne, 15th Baronet (1856—1948)
  Sir George Francis Osborne, 16th Baronet (1894—1960)
  Sir Peter George Osborne, 17th Baronet (born 1943)
 (1) Rt. Hon. George Gideon Oliver Osborne, CH (b. 1971)
 (2) Luke Benedict Osborne (b. 2001)
 (3) Benedict George Osborne (b. 1973)
 (4) Adam Peter Osborne (b. 1976)
 (5) Theo Grantley Osborne (b. 1985)
 (6) James Francis Osborne (b. 1946)
 (7) Harry Lucas Osborne (b. 1988)
 Edward Osborne (1861—1939)
 Stanley Patrick Osborne (1904—1989)
 (8) Anthony Trevor Osborne (b. 1934)
 (9) Marcus Duncan Fitzwilliam Osborne (b. 1967)
 Edward Peter Osborne (1938—2002)
 (10) John Philip Osborne (b. 1963)

References

 
Extinct baronetcies in the Baronetage of England
Baronetcies in the Baronetage of Ireland
1620 establishments in England
1629 establishments in Ireland